Lingshan is a town in Meilan District, Haikou City, Hainan Province, China. It is situated between the Nandu River to the west, and Guilinyang Town to the east. It has an old, busy, tree-lined centre, with a market and numerous small shops. There is a large Buddhist nunnery on the outskirts, located on the road to Guilinyang Town.

References

External links

 Hudong website, a wiki

Populated places in Hainan